The 1985 UCLA Bruins softball team represented the University of California, Los Angeles in the 1985 NCAA Division I softball season.  The Bruins were coached by Sharron Backus, who led her eleventh season.  The Bruins played their home games at Sunset Field and finished with a record of 41–9.  They competed in the Western Collegiate Athletic Association, where they finished second with a 9–3 record.

The Bruins were invited to the 1985 NCAA Division I softball tournament, where they won the At-large Regional and then completed a run through the Women's College World Series to claim their third NCAA Women's College World Series Championship.  The Bruins had earlier claimed an AIAW title in 1978, the first NCAA event in 1982 and the 1984 NCAA title.

Personnel

Roster

Coaches

Schedule

References

UCLA
UCLA Bruins softball seasons
1985 in sports in California
Women's College World Series seasons
NCAA Division I softball tournament seasons